Fructose intolerance may refer to:

 Fructose malabsorption, a digestive disorder of the small intestine in which the fructose carrier in enterocytes is deficient
 Hereditary fructose intolerance, a hereditary condition caused by a deficiency of liver enzymes that metabolise fructose